Mark  Balderas (born September 10, 1959 in Encino, California) is the keyboardist for the rock band Human Drama from 1986 to 1991 and  from 1993 to 2005 and has been currently active with the band since 2012.

Early life
Balderas was raised in West Hills, California, by Elisa Balderas, a housewife, and Henry Balderas, a manufacturer's representative in the electronics industry. He attended El Camino Real High School in Woodland Hills, California, where he played varsity American football. He went on to earn an Associate of Arts degree at Pierce College in Woodland Hills in 1980, and a Bachelor of Arts at California State University, Northridge, in 1982, majoring in Radio-Television-Film.

Musical career
Balderas started playing keyboards in Los Angeles with the band Newsbreak in 1983. The following year, he joined The Spectres. While playing with The Spectres in 1986, he auditioned for New Orleans, Louisiana, based Human Drama and became their keyboard player soon after. Human Drama contributed a song, "Wave of Darkness", to the 1987 collection Scream: The Compilation on Geffen Records.

A record deal with RCA Records in 1988 led to the EP "Hopes Prayers Dreams Heart Soul Mind Love Life Death" recorded at the famous Rockfield Studios in Wales and the LP Feel, both produced by Ian Broudie of The Lightning Seeds.

In mid-1990, after recording the single "This Tangled Web" from the critically acclaimed album The World Inside on Triple X Records, Balderas left the group to team up with keyboard player James Osborn to start recording a collection of traditional Christmas songs which they arranged and produced using keyboard orchestration.  Their waltz version of the classic "What Child is This" was released in 1995 on the compilation Excelsis Vol.1: A Dark Noel on Projekt Records. In 1991, Balderas joined up with Human Drama guitarist Michael Ciravolo’s new band The Congregation.

In 1993, with the release of Human Drama’s fourth album Pinups on Triple X Records, Balderas returned, this time for good. In 1994, Human Drama released the EP Human Drama on Projekt Records which included the first of five instrumentals songs, "Solitude I", written by Balderas. He also re-arranged "The Waiting Hour" from Feel with piano, strings and flute. The following year, Human Drama released Songs of Betrayal where Balderas added the remaining four instrumental songs "Solitude II-V". In 1996, Human Drama released Fourteen Thousand Three Hundred Eighty Four Days Later, a live, career-spanning retrospective released both on Hollow Hills/Triple X Records and the Mexican Opcion Sonica label. In 1997, Balderas recorded piano on Michael Aston's Gene Loves Jezebel album Love Lies Bleeding on Triple X Records. The song “Lifting the Vale” was later on the series Everwood Season 4 Episode 9 “Getting to know You”. He then co-wrote, with Johnny Indovina, the popular "A Single White Rose" for the next Human Drama album Solemn Sun Setting in 1998 on Triple X Records and in 2000, Human Drama released The Best of Human Drama...In a Perfect World on Triple X Records. In 2002, Human Drama released their final album, Cause and Effect, both on Projekt Records and, in Latin America, Noise Kontrol Records. Human Drama continued to perform live throughout America and Mexico until January 2005.

References

External links
 Human Drama's Official Site

1959 births
Living people
Musicians from Los Angeles
Gothic rock musicians
People from Encino, Los Angeles
Los Angeles Pierce College people
People from West Hills, Los Angeles
El Camino Real High School alumni
21st-century American keyboardists